The International Socialist League of South Africa was the earliest major Marxist party in South Africa, and a predecessor of the South African Communist Party. The ISL was founded around the syndicalist politics of the Industrial Workers of the World and Daniel De Leon.

History

Formed in September 1915, it established branches across much of South Africa (excluding the Western Cape). While early attempts to recruit white workers failed, the ISL soon came to the attention of the young African National Congress, (then called the "South African Native National Congress") and several prominent early ANC members attended ISL meetings. By September 1917 the ISL had helped to form the first black African trade union in the country, the Industrial Workers of Africa. While its founders were mainly drawn from the radical wing of the white working class, the movement would develop a substantial black African, Coloured and  Indian  membership. 

Following the Russian Revolution in 1917, the ISL became enthusiastic supporters of the Bolsheviks. David Ivon Jones, co-founder of the ISL and editor of the league's organ The International welcomed the revolution with an article titled "Dawn of the World." The article calls the revolution "an unfolding of the world-wide Commonwealth of Labour, which if the oppressed of all lands only knew...would sweep them into transports of gladness." This enthusiasm for the Bolsheviks would ultimately lead the ISL to merge with several other socialist organizations to form the Communist Party of South Africa in 1921.

The ISL became defunct following its merge into the Communist Party of South Africa (SACP) in 1921 but, provided many notable early figures to the Communist Party. The centrality of the ISL in the formation of the SACP left a political mark on the party for years to come, and was responsible for a strong syndicalist influence on the early politics of the SACP.

See also
 Anarchism in South Africa
 Socialist Labor Party
 South African Communist Party
 Industrial Workers of the World

References

Footnotes

Bibliography

Further reading

Articles

Books
 
 
 
 

Anarchism in South Africa
Defunct anarchist organizations in Africa
Defunct civic and political organisations in South Africa
History of anarchism
History of socialism
Organizations established in 1915
Syndicalism in South Africa